33 Cygni is a single star located 159 light years away in the northern constellation Cygnus. It is visible to the naked eye as a white-hued star with an apparent visual magnitude of 4.28. The star is moving closer to the Earth with a heliocentric radial velocity of −16 km/s. Eggen (1995) listed it as a proper motion candidate for membership in the IC 2391 supercluster.

This star has a stellar classification of A3 IV–Vn, showing a spectrum with traits intermediate between an A-type main-sequence star and an evolving subgiant star. The 'n' suffix indicates "nebulous" absorption lines due to rapid rotation. It is about 400 million years old with a high projected rotational velocity of 243 km/s. This rate of spin is giving the star an oblate shape with a pronounced equatorial bulge that is an estimated 28% wider than the polar radius.

33 Cyg has 2.33 times the mass of the Sun and 2.76 times the Sun's radius.

References

A-type main-sequence stars
A-type subgiants
Circumstellar disks
Cygnus (constellation)
Durchmusterung objects
Cygni, 33
192696
099655
7740